Dal Bati Churma is the most popular dish in Rajasthani cuisine. It is made of three components of bati, dal, and churma. Dal is lentils, bati is a baked wheat ball, and churma is powdered sweetened cereal. Churma is a popular delicacy usually served with baatis and dal. It is coarsely ground wheat crushed and cooked with ghee and sugar. Traditionally it is made by mashing up wheat flour baatis or left over rotis in ghee and jaggery.

External links 
 Rajasthan Cuisine 
 Recipe for Churma Ladoo

Rajasthani cuisine
Legume dishes

gu:દાલ બાટી
hi:दाल बाटी चूरमा